"Strong Enough" is a song by American singer-songwriter Sheryl Crow from her debut album, Tuesday Night Music Club (1993). The song reached number five on the US Billboard Hot 100 for three consecutive weeks, number three in Australia, and number one in Canada, becoming her second chart-topper there following "All I Wanna Do". In Australia, the song received a platinum certification for shipments exceeding 70,000 copies.

Crow performed the song on her live album Sheryl Crow and Friends: Live from Central Park alongside the Dixie Chicks. The song was later included on Crow's greatest hits album, The Very Best of Sheryl Crow.

Background and composition 
"Strong Enough" is an acoustic folk-pop song. In live performances, Crow often plays the accordion to it, although this instrument was not featured on the original recording.  The song is written in the key of D major with a moderately slow tempo of 79 beats per minute in the unusual  time signature.  It follows a chord progression of D–G5–Bm6–A, and Crow's vocals span from A3 to B4. Lyrically, the song finds the narrator in a frustrated relationship, looking for solace from her partner, despite the fact that his commitments may not be as true as her own.

Critical reception 
Steve Baltin from Cash Box wrote, "On the heels of her good-time up-tempo number "All I Wanna Do”, Crow comes back with a ballad, which was co-written by David Baerwald, formerly of David & David, along with five other people. And yet, even with all those helping hands, the song is a very straight-forward love song. Simple in arrangement though somewhat lush in melody, the real point is to showcase Crow’s vocal talents—which she has. Though the song may not be as big a hit as her first two singles, it sets Crow up for the long haul and is likely to be an adult/contemporary monster." Alan Jones from Music Week described "Strong Enough" as "another pleasing, though less commercial [than "All I Wanna Do"], song – a lilting, understated folksy piece. Not a huge single, but it will direct further attention to her album, Tuesday Night Music Club."

Music video 
A simple black-and-white music video was directed by Martin Bell. It features Crow in a largely empty room alternatively singing the song into a microphone and pacing anxiously through the room.

Track listings 

 US and Australian CD single
 "Strong Enough" (LP version) – 3:40
 "All I Wanna Do" (live) – 4:12
 "Reach Around Jerk" (live) – 4:22
 "Leaving Las Vegas" (live) – 5:29

 US 7-inch single
A. "Strong Enough" – 3:10
B. "Run Baby Run" – 4:53

 US cassette single
 "Strong Enough"
 "What I Can Do for You"

 UK 7-inch single
A. "Strong Enough"
B. "No One Said It Would Be Easy"

 UK CD1
 "Strong Enough"
 "All by Myself"
 "Strong Enough" (live at the Borderline)
 "Reach Around Jerk"

 UK CD2
 "Strong Enough"
 "No One Said It Would Be Easy"
 "All I Wanna Do" (live in Nashville)

 European CD single and Australian cassette single
 "Strong Enough" (LP version) – 3:10
 "Leaving Las Vegas" (live) – 5:29

Charts

Weekly charts

Year-end charts

Certifications

Release history

Covers and interpolations 
Travis Tritt wrote and released an answer song called "Strong Enough to Be Your Man" in 2002.

References 

1993 songs
1994 singles
A&M Records singles
The Chicks songs
RPM Top Singles number-one singles
Sheryl Crow songs
Song recordings produced by Bill Bottrell
Songs written by Bill Bottrell
Songs written by Brian MacLeod (U.S. musician)
Songs written by David Baerwald
Songs written by David Ricketts
Songs written by Kevin Gilbert (musician)
Songs written by Sheryl Crow